Ralijaona Laingo (born 25 May 1905 in Antananambo, Madagascar; died 30 May 1986) was a politician from  Madagascar who served in the French Senate from 1952-1958 .

References 
 page on the French Senate website

Malagasy politicians
French Senators of the Fourth Republic
1905 births
1986 deaths
Senators of French East Africa
People from Sava Region